Caledonia Regional High School is a Canadian secondary school in Hillsborough, New Brunswick. It is a “Centre of Academic Excellence” according to the local news media and the least populated high school in all of Anglophone East School District.

Caledonia Regional has approximately 270 students enrolled in grades 6 through 12.  The school also serves the communities Riverside-Albert and Alma in addition to the communities from Stoney Creek to Fundy National Park.  The school offers Late French Immersion.

See also
 List of schools in New Brunswick
 Anglophone South School District

References

External links
Official School Website
Anglophone East School District Website
Caledonia Regional High Alumni Group on Facebook

High schools in New Brunswick
Schools in Albert County, New Brunswick
Middle schools in New Brunswick